The Autovía A-42 (also known as Autovía de Toledo) is a Spanish autovía which connects Madrid to Toledo. It was built in the mid-1980s as an upgrade of the N-401 road between the two cities, and received the A-42 designation in 2003 as part of the general renumbering of Spanish autovías.

In the mid-2000s, the Autopista AP-41 was built to supersede the A-42, though the autovía is still regularly used.

Beyond Toledo, the A-42 continues through the community of Castile-La Mancha to Tomelloso as the CM-42, itself an upgrade of the CM-400.

Project 
On May 9, 2006, the City of Getafe signed an agreement with the Ministry of Public Works to move the road to make it pass through Getafe.

Cities contiguous to Autovía A-42
 Leganés
 Getafe
 Fuenlabrada
 Pinto
 Parla
 Valdemoro
 Torrejón de la Calzada
 Torrejón de Velasco
 Casarrubuelos
 Illescas
 Yuncos
 Numancia de la Sagra
 Yuncler
 Villaluenga de la Sagra
 Cabañas de la Sagra
 Olías del Rey

References

A-42
A-42
A-42